Sanathnagar Assembly constituency is a constituency of Telangana Legislative Assembly, India. It is one of 15 constituencies in Capital city of Hyderabad. It is part of Secunderabad Lok Sabha constituency.

Talasani Srinivas Yadav, current Animal Husbandry, Fisheries and Cinematography Minister of Telangana is representing the constituency.

Area under the constituency
The Assembly Constituency presently comprises the following neighbourhoods:

Members of Assembly

Election results

Telangana Legislative Assembly election, 2018

Telangana Legislative Assembly election, 2014

See also
 Sanathnagar
 List of constituencies of Telangana Legislative Assembly

References

Assembly constituencies of Telangana